= Arthur W. Butler Memorial Sanctuary =

- Arthur W. Butler Memorial Sanctuary
- Location within New York
- Nearest city: Bedford
- Coordinates: 41.1834286°N 73.6915191°W
- Area: 352 acres (142 ha)
- Established: 1954
- Governing body: The Nature Conservancy
- Website: www.nature.org/en-us/get-involved/how-to-help/places-we-protect/arthur-w-butler-memorial-sanctuary/

The Arthur W. Butler Memorial Sanctuary is located in Westchester County New York. The preserve was donated by his wife in 1954 or 1955 following his death. The original donation was 225 acres, with further donations expanding it to its current size of either 352 acres or 363 acres. The Sanctuary is administered by The Nature Conservancy.
